Flavivirin (Yellow fever virus (flavivirus) protease, NS2B-3 proteinase) is an enzyme.

References

External links 
 

EC 3.4.21
Yellow fever